Hillcrest Apartment is a historic apartment building at 1509-1515 Hinman Avenue in Evanston, Illinois. Built in 1922, the three-story brick building has a U-shaped plan with a central courtyard, a common layout for suburban apartment buildings. The courtyard is fenced and gated on its open side, providing privacy despite the building's downtown location. Architect Roy F. France designed the building in the Georgian Revival style. The building's design includes limestone trim meant to approximate quoins, a balustrade with ornamental urns, and pediments atop the entrance blocks.

The building was added to the National Register of Historic Places on March 15, 1984.

References

Buildings and structures on the National Register of Historic Places in Cook County, Illinois
Residential buildings on the National Register of Historic Places in Illinois
Buildings and structures in Evanston, Illinois
Residential buildings completed in 1922
Georgian Revival architecture in Illinois
Apartment buildings in Illinois